Sterjo Spasse (14 August 1914 – 12 September 1989) was an Albanian prose writer and novelist.

Life
Sterjo Spasse was born in 1914 in Gollomboç, Pustec Municipality, Korçë District, Albania, of Macedonian Slav descent. Spasse pursued the elementary school in Korçë, and later, the Shkolla Normale e Elbasanit. He worked as a teacher in Derviçan, in the Dropull region, and then went to the University of Florence, Italy to study Pedagogy. He also pursued a master in literature in the Soviet Union. 

Along his various contributions in the pedagogic field and translations, his main fieldwork was creative writing, which started in the 1930s. He published four collections of short stories and 10 novels: After World War II he worked as a literary critic and writer in the pedagogic magazines The new school, and The popular education, as well as Our Literature, and November. 
Spasse's novel Pse? is considered one of his better novels. He was a member of the Albanian League of Writers and Artists. Spasse died in Tirana, Albania in 1989.

A museum dedicated to Sterjo Spasse was opened in his native village of Glloboçen in 2022.

Short stories
"Kuror rinie" (Youth crown), 1934.
"Në krahët e një femre" (In the arms of a woman), 1934.
"Nusja pa duvak" (Bride without veil), 1944.
"Të fala nga fshati", (Regards from the village), 1958.

Novels
"Pse ?" (Why ?), 1935.
"Afërdita" (Afërdita), 1944.
"Ata nuk ishin vetëm" (They were not alone), 1952.
"Afërdita përsëri në fshat" (Afërdita back in the village), 1954.
"Buzë liqenit" (Lakeside), 1965.
"Zjarre..." (Fires...), 1972.
"Zgjimi" (Awakening), 1973.
"Pishtarë" (Beacons), 1975.
"Ja vdekje ja liri" (Death or freedom), 1978.
"Kryengritësit" (Rebels), 1983.

References

1914 births
Ethnic Macedonian people
Albanian-language writers
Albanian novelists
Postmodern writers
1989 deaths
20th-century novelists
Socialist realism writers
University of Elbasan alumni
People from Pustec
Albanian people of Macedonian descent